The Kontagora Emirate is a traditional state with the capital city of Kontagora, Niger State, Nigeria. The Kontagora Emirate is among the major emirates in Niger state like Kagara Emirate, Suleja Emirate and others

History
Kontagora is made up of territory originally divided between various minor chiefdoms (Aguarra, Dakka-Karri, Kambari, Dukawa, and Ngaski) which were conquered by the Fula people between 1858 and 1864, and turned into the emirate of Kontagora, a dependency of the Sokoto Caliphate.

Following a well-armed attack, starting on 31 January 1901, the emirate fell under British rule, becoming a province first in the British Protectorate of Northern Nigeria and then in the British colony of Nigeria, until independence in 1960.

Kontagora now consists of Kontagora emirates, containing the chiefdom of Wushishi, the territories of Sarkin Bauchi, and the chiefdom of Kagara, all administratively grouped into the Mariga, Magama, and Rafi Local Governments.

List of rulers
Names and dates taken from John Stewart's African States and Rulers (1989).

References

Nigerian traditional states
Emirates